K.O. is the sixth studio album by Mexican singer Danna Paola, released on January 13, 2021, by Universal Music Mexico. The album has spawned eight singles: "Contigo", "Sola", "TQ Y YA", "No Bailes Sola" with Sebastián Yatra, "Me, Myself" with Mika, "Friend de Semana" with Luísa Sonza and Aitana, "Calla Tú" and "Amor Ordinario". K.O. received a nomination for a Latin Grammy Award for Best Pop Vocal Album.

Background
As Paola told Billboard, work on K.O. began as early as 2018, even before she released her previous album Sie7e + (2020). The singer confessed that the first song she wrote for the album was "Friend de Semana" while she was still living in Madrid and shooting Elite. Paola described the album as "personal" and highlighted "Amor Ordinario" as the "most personal" of the album: "[the song] defines my emotional process and everyone that heard it felt my pain and what I went through from beginning to end. I wrote this song in January 2020 and I had to understand what ordinary love meant and that I deserved better".

Title
K.O. is the abbreviated form for "knockout", which is a fight-ending, winning criterion in several full-contact combat sports, such as boxing, kickboxing, muay thai, mixed martial arts, karate, some forms of taekwondo and other sports involving striking, as well as fighting-based video games. Paola explained the meaning of the title to Billboard: "With this album, I knocked out all of the bad stuff that was killing me, emotionally. I used it to drain everything I had in my heart. That's why I named it K.O. — because it was like the last punch to the heart during this whole process".

Release
On Monday, January 11, 2021, Paola posted a series of photos to Instagram with the caption "Welcome to my break-up party" and announced that she would finally be releasing her sixth studio album, K.O., on Thursday, January 14. However, on Wednesday, January 13, the entire album leaked online and the release was brought forward by a day.

Track listing

Charts

Certifications

References

2021 albums
Danna Paola albums
Universal Music Mexico albums
Spanish-language albums
Latin pop albums